2018 Thai League 3 Lower Region is the 2nd season of the Thai football league. It is a part of the Thai League 3 and the feeder league for the Thai League 2. A total of 14 teams will compete in the league this season, after Banbueng withdrew before the season started.

Changes from Last Season

Team changes

Promoted Clubs

A club was promoted from the 2017 Thai League 4
 BTU United

A clubs was promoted to the 2018 Thai League 2
 Samut Sakhon

Relegated Clubs

A club was relegated to the 2018 Thai League 4 Western Region
 Krung Thonburi

A club was relegated from the 2017 Thai League 2
 Songkhla United

Renamed Clubs 
 Banbueng authorize from Phuket City because Banbueng is an absolute football club quota.
 Bangkok University Deffo was renamed to Deffo
 Nakhon Si Thammarat Unity was renamed to WU Nakhon Si United

Expansion Clubs

 Songkhla United and Krung Thonburi Club-licensing football club didn't pass to play 2018 Thai League 3 Lower Region. This team is banned 2 years and Relegated to 2020 Thai League 4 Southern Region for Songkhla United, 2020 Thailand Amateur League Bangkok Metropolitan Region for Krung Thonburi .

Teams

Stadium and locations

Foreign players

A T3 team could registered five foreign players by at least one player from AFC member countries and at least one player from ASEAN member countries. A team can use four foreign players on the field in each game, including at least one player from the AFC member countries or ASEAN member countries (3+1).
Note :: players who released during summer transfer window;: players who registered during summer transfer window;↔: players who have dual nationality by half-caste or naturalization.

League table

Positions by round

Results by round

Results

Season statistics

Top scorers
As of 26 August 2018.

Hat-tricks

Attendance

Attendance by home match played

Source: Thai League 3
Note: Some error of T3 official match report 28 July 2018 (Trang 3–1 Ranong United).
 Some error of T3 official match report 5 August 2018 (Nara United 7–0 Simork).

References

 Club licensing document passed

External links
Thai League 3
Thailandsusu.com
Smmsport.com

Thai League 3
2018 in Thai football leagues